James Albert Long (June 29, 1898 – September 14, 1970) was a catcher in Major League Baseball. He played for the Chicago White Sox.

References

External links

1898 births
1970 deaths
Major League Baseball catchers
Chicago White Sox players
Baseball players from Iowa
Sportspeople from Fort Dodge, Iowa
Enid Harvesters players
Fort Smith Twins players
Mexia Gushers players
Mitchell Kernels players
Oklahoma City Indians players
San Antonio Bears players
Syracuse Stars (minor league baseball) players
Wichita Aviators players
Wichita Larks players